Edson Leonardo Hoces Pereira (born 3 July 1976) is a Chilean former footballer who played as a defender.

Biography
Hoces played for the Indonesian clubs TIRA-Persikabo, Persiku Kudus and PSIS Semarang before returning to his country of birth, Chile, to play for Deportes Melipilla.

In 2014, he helped the Indonesia Team in the Homeless World Cup in Santiago, Chile.

Personal life
Since 2011, he manages a company focused in lodging and food services.

References

External links
 
 Edson Hoces at playmakerstats.com (English version of ceroacero.es)
 Edson Hoces at Tribuna.com 
 

1976 births
Living people
Chilean footballers
Chilean expatriate footballers
Persikabo 1973 players
Persiku Kudus players
PSIS Semarang players
Deportes Melipilla footballers
Liga 2 (Indonesia) players
Liga 1 (Indonesia) players
Segunda División Profesional de Chile players
Association football defenders
Chilean expatriate sportspeople in Vietnam
Expatriate footballers in Vietnam
Chilean expatriate sportspeople in Indonesia
Expatriate footballers in Indonesia